Why, Charlie Brown, Why? is the 33rd prime-time animated TV special based upon the comic strip Peanuts by Charles M. Schulz. It originally aired on March 16, 1990, and was also nominated for an Emmy. It is the first Charlie Brown special of the 1990s.

Plot
Janice Emmons is a new friend and classmate of Charlie Brown and Linus, who loves to play on the swings. The special begins with Charlie Brown, Sally, Linus, and Janice waiting for the school bus. As Janice boards the bus, she hits her arm on a railing, causing it to bruise; Linus notices that Janice has been bruising easily lately. When they arrive at school, Janice starts feeling ill. She tells Linus that she is feeling tired and has a fever, so she is sent to the school nurse and is later picked up by her mother. Three days later, the class is told that Janice is in the hospital.

After school, Linus and Charlie Brown decide to visit Janice in the hospital, where she tells them that she has cancer (specifically leukemia). Janice explains what tests the doctors did to discover that she had leukemia (blood test, bone marrow test, and X-ray). She then shows them her IV line and explains her chemotherapy. Despite her illness, Janice is determined to recover and return to school, so she can play on the swings and be with her friends again.

The news of Janice's illness hits Linus especially hard, as he appears to be falling for her. As Charlie Brown and Linus leave the hospital, Linus asks, "Why, Charlie Brown, why?" He then walks home feeling both sad and angry, thinking about Janice's condition. When he arrives home, he challenges the ignorance of his sister Lucy towards Janice's illness and tells her cancer does not spread like the cold or flu. It's not long until Linus tells Lucy that he remembers the part when he touched Janice's forehead (trying to feel how warm she was). Lucy is shocked. However, her initial shock becomes an outrage when she finds out that Linus actually touched Janice. She also says that Janice probably got that disease because she is a creepy kid. Linus tells Lucy off, saying he doesn't want to catch her crabby attitude. Some months later, Janice's health has improved enough for her to return to school, but she has lost her hair because of the chemotherapy, and wears a cap to hide it.

At school, this attracts the attention of a schoolyard bully, who teases Janice for the color of the cap she is wearing. He knocks it off, revealing her bald head. He then makes fun of her for it. Livid, Linus stands up for Janice and confronts the boy, angrily telling him about Janice's illness and asking him if he would like to go through what Janice has gone through. The boy apologizes to Janice and Linus and compliments her on the cap.  As Christmas approaches, Linus goes to Janice's house to give her a present, but one of Janice's two sisters informs Linus that she is at the hospital again, receiving treatment. The other sister complains of the attention Janice has been receiving, and later admits she and her other sister feel left out since Janice got sick. Linus gives her the present and leaves.

By the beginning of spring, Janice returns again and tells Linus she has a surprise for him, and she reveals the surprise at the end of the special while playing on the swings. The surprise fills Linus with joy, as Janice's cap falls off revealing that her long blonde hair has grown back even longer than it was before, marking the end of her chemotherapy, and meaning that she has recovered.

During the closing credits, the cap falls to the ground, and Janice laughs one last time (although it is not revealed whether there was the same depiction in the first place).

Hymn
This special also included a brief rendition of the hymn "Farther Along", sung by Becky Reardon. The song played in the background as an angry Linus tries to make sense of Janice's illness.

Cast
 Kaleb Henley as Charlie Brown
 Brandon Stewart as Linus Van Pelt
 Adrienne Stiefel as Sally Brown
 Jennifer Banko as Lucy Van Pelt
 Olivia Burnette as Janice Emmons
 Dion Zamora as schoolyard bully
 Brittany Thornton as Janice's curly-haired sister
 Lindsay Sloane as Janice's red-haired sister
 Bill Melendez as Snoopy and Woodstock
Peppermint Patty, Schroeder, Marcie, Franklin, Violet, and Shermy make cameo appearances.

Production and reception
The idea for Why, Charlie Brown, Why? was conceived by Sylvia Cook, a registered nurse at the Stanford Children's Hospital. In December 1985, Cook sent a letter to Charles M. Schulz, asking him to produce a short animated film about cancer for young patients featuring the Peanuts characters. Schulz was initially doubtful because of the anticipated high production costs. Eventually, Cook received input from the American Cancer Society, which convinced Schulz to produce, rather than just a five-minute film, a half-hour special about the subject. Producer Bill Melendez and CBS initially balked at this idea, but eventually agreed to do it because of Schulz's enthusiasm for the project. The script of the special was completely written by Schulz, with Cook and the American Cancer Society serving as consultants .

Cancer was a subject with which Schulz was familiar; his mother Dena had died of cancer when he was in his twenties, and Schulz himself would succumb to colon cancer in 2000. The special has been shown in hospitals and in public education systems, primarily elementary schools and junior high schools, as a method for explaining the subject to children, and is also a part of the Pennies for Patients fundraiser campaign organized by The Leukemia & Lymphoma Society. Paramount Home Video released the special on VHS on January 9, 1996, and debuted on DVD in 2015 as part of the Peanuts Emmy Honored Collection. The special is available on iTunes. The special has rarely aired on US television since its original premiere; Disney Channel has re-aired it while Nickelodeon and ABC, which at different points have withheld the rights to the Peanuts specials, have not. It has been seen on Boomerang in some European countries. The special is also streaming on Apple TV+, remastered to high definition.

A book adaptation of the special, titled Why, Charlie Brown, Why? A Story About What Happens When a Friend is Very Ill, was published by Pharos Books some weeks before the special's premiere on CBS, and was reissued in 2002. The original printing featured a foreword by actor Paul Newman.

Critical reaction to the special was overwhelmingly positive, with reviewers praising it for its realism and poignancy, and for Janice's bravery in facing her disease.

The first airing of this special brought in an 8.7 household rating and a 16 percent audience share, ranking 65th out of 86 shows that week, and was watched by 15 million viewers.

Nominations
Why, Charlie Brown, Why? was nominated for the Emmy for an Outstanding Animated Program (For Programming One Hour or Less) and the Humanitas Prize.

References

External links
 

Peanuts television specials
Films about cancer
1990s American television specials
CBS original programming
1990 television specials
1990s animated television specials
1990s American animated films
1990 in American television
CBS television specials
Television shows written by Charles M. Schulz
Television shows directed by Sam Jaimes